Förklädd Gud (God in Disguise) were an improvisational jazz group from Sweden. They formed in the early 1970s, and consisted of a constantly changing line-up of musicians from the fields of jazz, rock, and art music. In 1977, they released their self-titled album on the Caprice Records label.

The band were included on the Nurse With Wound list.

Förklädd Gud (1977)

Track listing
 "Suite Birth" (26'40")
 "Davis' Cup" (3'37")
 "Fläsklägg" (6'31")
 "Ditt Rosa Kranium" (5'16")
 "Hopplös Flamenco" (7'30")
 "After Ours" (1'7")

Swedish musical groups